Vytautas Lalas (born 21 July 1982) is a Lithuanian professional strongman the winner of the 2013 Arnold Strongman Classic and runner up of the 2012 World's Strongest Man.

Strongman
Lalas won the junior Lithuanian championships in 2005, and Lithuania's Strongest Man in 2010.

Lalas won the Giants Live Poland event on 8 August 2010. This victory qualified Lalas for the 2010 World's Strongest Man competition in Sun City, South Africa, but he was unable to qualify for the finals.

Lalas placed third in the 2011 Giants Live London event in March 2011, this placing qualified him for the 2011 World's Strongest Man contest later that year in Wingate, North Carolina. Lalas eventually made the finals and finished in 6th place overall in that contest.

Lalas won the Strongman Champions League Finland event on 12 June 2011, and placed second at the 2011 SCL Bulgaria event.

Lalas placed second at the 2012 Europe's Strongest Man contest which qualified him for the 2012 World's Strongest Man contest later in the year where he eventually placed second in the finals behind fellow Lithuanian Žydrūnas Savickas.

Lalas set a new world record in the giant barbell squat event in the qualifying heats at the 2012 WSM by squatting  for 11 repetitions.

Lalas finished third at the inaugural 2012 SCL Savickas Classic and third at the 2012 World Log Lift Championships in Vilnius, Lithuania on 7 October 2012.

Lalas finished first at the 2013 Arnold Strongman Classic in Columbus, Ohio on 2 March 2013. Lalas also won the Strongman Champions League FIBO event in Germany on 13 April 2013.

Between 2014 and 2016, and again in 2017, Lalas had back problems. Despite this, he still managed to win Lithuania's Strongest Man in both 2016 and 2018.

Personal records:-

Deadlift - 420kg(Elephant bar)

Squat - 320kg for 11 reps

Hummer tyer deadlift - 506.5kg

Gym Lifts:-

Squat - 380kg for 2 reps (RAW)

Deadlift - 370kg for 3 reps

Other records:-

Log lift - 205kg , 

200kg for 2 reps(done in Arnold strongman classic)

Axel press - 195kg

Slater Stone(Atlas stone) - 245kg

Growing yoke carry - 640kg for 3m11'(done in Arnold strongman classic)

Circus dumbbell (120kg) - for 5 easy reps

Personal life
Lalas has two brothers who also compete in strongman. Marius, who won Lithuania's Strongest Man in 2019 and Mantas, who placed 3rd in the same contest. Vytautas is married with 3 kids

References

1982 births
Living people
Lithuanian strength athletes
People from Mažeikiai